Mal Waldron Plays the Blues is a live album by American jazz pianist Mal Waldron recorded in Munich in 1971 and released on the Enja label.

Reception
The AllMusic review by Scott Yanow awarded the album 3 stars stating "The three Waldron and two Woode compositions generally have their own personalities (although none became standards) and serve as excellent showcases for Waldron's repetitive and percussive style. A fine effort".

Track listing
All compositions by Mal Waldron except as indicated
 Announcement – 1:30  
 "Blues For F.P." – 11:23  
 "Way In" – 9:18  
 Announcement – 1:12  
 "Miles and Miles of Blues" – 5:32  
 "Up Down Blues" (Jimmy Woode) – 6:03  
 "Blues For D.S." (Woode) – 9:07 
Recorded at the Domicile in Munich, West Germany on June 29, 1971.

Personnel
 Mal Waldron – piano 
 Jimmy Woode – bass
 Pierre Favre – drums

References

Enja Records live albums
Mal Waldron albums
1971 live albums